The Tower of Amfikleia is a late medieval tower at Amfikleia, in Phthiotis, central Greece.

Amfikleia (formerly Dadi), occupies a strategic location on the northern slopes of Mount Parnassus and south of the Boeotic Cephissus. The tower is located on the site of the acropolis of ancient Amphicleia, which today is occupied by the cemetery of the modern settlement.

The doorway, which survives in part, preserves sockets for a closing bar. The other faces of the tower feature slit windows.

References

Sources
 
 
 

Amfikleia
Duchy of Athens
Amfikleia
Buildings and structures in Phthiotis